was a Japanese painter, book illustrator, and art teacher. He was born (as Yasuda Bairei) and lived in Kyoto. He was a member of the broad Maruyama-Shijo school and was a master of kacho-e painting (depictions of birds and flowers) in the Meiji period of Japan.

Biography
In 1852, he went to study with the Maruyama-school painter, Nakajima Raisho (1796–1871).  After Raisho's death, Bairei studied with the Shijo-school master Shiokawa Bunrin (1808–77).

His work included flower prints, bird prints

, and landscapes, with a touch of western realism. Bairei's Album of One Hundred Birds was published in 1881.

He opened an art school in 1880 and his students included Takeuchi Seihō, Kawai Gyokudō, and Uemura Shōen.

External links

 The Lavenberg Collection - Kōno Bairei
 Brooklyn Museum - Owls On Tree Limb

Notes

1844 births
1895 deaths
People from Kyoto
Japanese printmakers
Japanese illustrators
19th-century Japanese painters
Imperial household artists